Mirit is a feminine given name. Notable people with the name include:

 Mirit I. Aladjem, Israeli-American biologist
 Mirit Cohen (1945–1990), Israeli artist

Feminine given names